The quadratic residuosity problem (QRP) in computational number theory is to decide, given integers  and , whether  is a quadratic residue modulo  or not.

The problem was first described by Gauss in his Disquisitiones Arithmeticae in 1801. 
This problem is believed to be computationally difficult.
Several cryptographic methods rely on its hardness, see .

An efficient algorithm for the quadratic residuosity problem immediately implies efficient algorithms for other number theoretic problems, such as deciding whether a composite  of unknown factorization is the product of 2 or 3 primes.

Precise formulation 

.

Otherwise we say it is a quadratic non-residue.
When  is a prime, it is customary to use the Legendre symbol:

It is easy to compute using the law of quadratic reciprocity in a manner akin to the Euclidean algorithm, see Legendre symbol.

However, it is easy to compute their product.
This is known as the Jacobi symbol:

This can also be efficiently computed using the law of quadratic reciprocity for Jacobi symbols.

However,  can not in all cases tell us whether  is a quadratic residue modulo  or not!
We cannot distinguish these cases from knowing just that .

This leads to the precise formulation of the quadratic residue problem:

Problem:

Distribution of residues 

If  is drawn uniformly at random from integers  such that , is  more often a quadratic residue or a quadratic non-residue modulo ?

Consequently, exactly half of the possible  are quadratic residues and the remaining are not.

Applications

The intractability of the quadratic residuosity problem is the basis for the security of the Blum Blum Shub pseudorandom number generator. It also yields the public key Goldwasser–Micali cryptosystem. as well as the identity based  Cocks scheme.

See also
 Higher residuosity problem

References

Computational number theory
Computational hardness assumptions
Theory of cryptography